Lee Chang-gil (21 March 1949 – 2002) was a South Korean boxer. He competed in the men's lightweight event at the 1968 Summer Olympics. At the 1968 Summer Olympics, he lost to Ronnie Harris of the United States.

References

1949 births
2002 deaths
South Korean male boxers
Olympic boxers of South Korea
Boxers at the 1968 Summer Olympics
Sportspeople from Seoul
Lightweight boxers